Legends of the Super Heroes is a 2002 album by Austin, Texas based singer-songwriter Beaver Nelson, released on Freedom Records.

Reviews

Track listing
Clean it Up
Baloney Bay
Digging a Well
Anything Easy Left
Chameleon Brain
Government-Sanctioned Hayride
Sleep (No Rest)
It Seems So Simple
Last Summer
Mile Markers
Some Day Just Like Today

References

Freedom Records albums
2002 albums